The 2010 Saint Francis Cougars football team represented the University of Saint Francis, located in Fort Wayne, Indiana, in the 2010 NAIA football season. They were led by head coach Kevin Donley, who served his 13th year as the first and only head coach in the history of Saint Francis football.  The Cougars played their home games at Bishop John D'Arcy Stadium and were members of the Mid-States Football Association (MSFA) Mideast League (MEL). The Cougars finished in 2nd place in the MSFA MEL division, but they received an at-large bid to participate in the postseason NAIA playoffs.

Schedule 
(10-2 overall, 6-1 conference)

Game summaries
The 2010 season began explosively as the 17th-ranked Cougars won impressively on the road, 70-7.
9/18/2010 - Week #2 saw the Cougars elevated to 11th in the national rankings.  The opponent for the home-opener was another ranked team, 17th-ranked St. Ambrose.  Trailing 17-0 at the half, the Cougars showed some maturity by rebounding in the second half for a 31-20 win.  For their victory, the Cougars were rewarded with a rise in the rankings to the 9th best team in the country.

9/25/2010 - Leading 28-3 at the half, USF held on for a hard-fought road victory against a highly regarded Marian.  The road win was the first game for Marian in their new St. Vincent Health Field.

10/9/2010 - The win over Walsh was an upset in the national rankings that listed Walsh as #8 and USF as the #9 team in the nation.

10/23/2010 - With a 41-14 home win over Missouri U S&T, the 7th-ranked Cougars remained undefeated and avenged a 2-point loss on the road against last year's Miners.

10/30/2010 - With their 63-0 win over Olivet Nazarene, USF record moved to 8-0 for the season.  Next week's game at #3 St. Xavier will match two undefeated, NAIA top-10 Cougar teams to decide the conference and division championships.

11/6/2010 - St. Xavier dominated this game in a 30-6 victory for the home team.  The six point offensive output was the lowest points scored by a USF team in a regular season game since the 11th game of their program, the opening game of the 1999 season.  For the second time in two years, this victory gave the MSFA conference and league title to St. Xavier.

11/13/2010 - With their 33-21 win over Taylor University, USF avenged the season-ending loss from a year ago.  The win guarantees the 10th-ranked USF an appearance next week in the opening round of the 16-team NAIA Championship tournament.

11/20/2010 - Ranked #10 in the final NAIA regular-season poll, USF drew a road trip to Lindenwood for the first round of the playoffs.  The 5th-ranked Lions, 9-1 on the regular season, entered the game with the nation's highest scoring offense.  The Cougars pulled off the upset win, 44-38, with an offense that efficiently controlled the football for over 40 minutes of the 60-minute game.  For the win, the Cougars earned a rematch in the second round against MSFA foe St. Xavier.

11/27/2010 - The Cougars return visit to St. Xavier ended with the same results as the first meeting of the year, a 40-21 loss.  Thus, the USF season ended with a 10-2 record, with both losses coming on the St. Xavier home field.

1/10/2011 - The Cougars were recognized for their successful season by voters in the postseason NAIA football polls.  The Cougars improved 5 spots in the polls, behind only the four semifinalists in the national tournament.  The 5th-place ranking gave the Cougars their best poll position of the season.

Ranking movements

References

Saint Francis
Saint Francis Cougars football seasons
Saint Francis Cougars football